Qalat Saleh Sport Club, is an Iraqi football team based in Qal'at Saleh District, Maysan, that plays in the Iraq Division Two.

History
Qalat Saleh Club was founded in 1992 in Maysan.

See also 
 2018–19 Iraq FA Cup
 2021–22 Iraq Division Two

References

External links
 Qalat Saleh SC on Goalzz.com

1992 establishments in Iraq
Association football clubs established in 1992
Football clubs in Maysan